Spyridium cinereum, commonly known as tiny spiridium, is a species of flowering plant in the family Rhamnaceae and is endemic to south-eastern continental Australia. It is a low-lying shrub with heart-shaped leaves, the narrower end towards the base, and heads of whitish, shaggy-hairy flowers with brown bracts at the base of the heads.

Description
Both surfaces of the leaves are woolly-hairy, especially the upper surface, and the edges of the leaves are rolled under.

Taxonomy
Spyridium cinereum was first formally described in 1957 by Norman Arthur Wakefield in The Victorian Naturalist of specimens he collected near Mallacoota aerodrome. The specific epithet (cinereum) means "ash-coloured".

Distribution
Spyridium cinereum grows in coastal heath and low scrub in disjunct populations near Nadgee in the far south-east of New South Wales, far north-eastern Victoria and in the north-east Grampians.

References

cinereum
Rosales of Australia
Flora of New South Wales
Flora of Victoria (Australia)
Taxa named by Norman Arthur Wakefield
Plants described in 1957